Alfred Sauvy (31 October 1898 – 30 October 1990) was a demographer, anthropologist and historian of the French economy. Sauvy coined the term Third World ("Tiers Monde") in reference to countries that were unaligned with either the Communist Soviet bloc or the Capitalist NATO bloc during the Cold War.

Biography
Sauvy was born in Villeneuve-de-la-Raho (Pyrénées-Orientales) in 1898 to a family of Catalan wine-growers, and educated at the École Polytechnique. After graduating, he worked at Statistique Générale de France until 1937. He took part in the X-Crise Group. From 1938, he was economic advisor to Minister of Finance Paul Reynaud until the second world war broke out in 1939.  

Under the Nazi occupation, Sauvy contributed to the Bulletins rouge-brique, a government-sanctioned periodical. After the war, Charles de Gaulle offered to appoint him to the position of General Secretary for Family and Population, but Sauvy preferred to devote himself to demographics. 

From 1940-1959, he taught at the Institut d’études politiques (IEP) and was Professor of Social Demography at the Collège de France.

He became director of INED (National Institute of Demographic Studies) and simultaneously represented France at the commission of Statistics and Population of the United Nations. He was a member of the American Academy of Arts and Sciences (1973) and the American Philosophical Society (1974). He wrote for Le Monde until his death in October 1990.

Key ideas
Writing in 1949, Sauvy described potential overpopulation as a 'false problem' and argued against attempts at global population control. He suggested examining countries on a case-by-case basis to determine whether they lack the raw materials and natural resources that can support a larger population. Otherwise, he thought that we run the risk of underpopulating a country that could support a much larger population

Sauvy coined the term 'Third World' in an article published in the French magazine, L'Observateur on August 14, 1952. He wrote:

"...car enfin, ce Tiers Monde ignoré, exploité, méprisé comme le Tiers Etat, veut lui aussi, être quelque chose"
"...because at the end, this ignored, exploited, scorned Third World, like the Third Estate, wants also, to become something".

Sauvy coined Third World by analogy with the Third Estate and the above quote is a paraphrase of Sieyès's famous sentence about the Third Estate during the French Revolution.

Works
1958 De Malthus à Mao-Tsé-Toung (Collection Thémis -Sciences sociales) 
1977 Coût et valeur de la vie humaine—Paris : Hermann, 210 p.
1980 La machine et le chômage : les progrès techniques et l'emploi—Paris : Dunod/Bordas, 320 p. 
1984 Le travail noir et l'économie de demain—Paris : Calmann-Lévy, 304 p. 
1985 De la rumeur à l'histoire—Paris : Dunod, 304 p. 
1990 La terre et les hommes : le monde où il va, le monde d'où il vient—Paris : Economica, 187 p.

Legacy
The Prix Alfred Sauvy (Alfred Sauvy Prize) is awarded annually to startup projects and social enterprises in the Pyrénées-Orientales region. 

There are streets named after Sauvy in Pollestres, Rivesaltes, and Villemolaque in France.

References

Martínez Coll, Juan Carlos (2001): Grandes Economistas, Economistas - Enciclopedia EMVI | eumed.net February 22, 2004
Tepperman, Lorne (2007): Social Problems: A Canadian Perspective, Social Problems: A Canadian Perspective, Second Edition | Higher Education | Oxford University Press Canada December 11, 2010
The original article published L'Observateur on August 14, 1952.

1898 births
1990 deaths
People from Pyrénées-Orientales
École Polytechnique alumni
Grand Officiers of the Légion d'honneur
20th-century French historians
French male non-fiction writers
20th-century French male writers
French demographers
Members of the American Philosophical Society